In Inuit mythology, Akna ("mother") is a goddess of fertility and childbirth.

References

Fertility goddesses
Inuit goddesses
Creator goddesses
Childhood goddesses